The Netherlands Football League Championship 1934–1935 was contested by 50 teams participating in five divisions. The national champion would be determined by a play-off featuring the winners of the eastern, northern, southern and two western football divisions of the Netherlands. PSV won this year's championship by beating Go Ahead, AFC Ajax, Velocitas 1897 and DWS.

New entrants
Eerste Klasse East:
Promoted from 2nd Division: ZAC
Eerste Klasse North:
Promoted from 2nd Division: HSC
Eerste Klasse South:
Promoted from 2nd Division: Juliana
Eerste Klasse West-I:
Moving in from West-II: DFC, RCH, VUC and Xerxes
Promoted from 2nd Division: Overmaas Rotterdam
Eerste Klasse West-II:
Moving in from West-I: HFC Haarlem, Hermes DVS, Sparta Rotterdam and ZFC
Promoted from 2nd Division: DWS

Divisions

Eerste Klasse East

Eerste Klasse North

Eerste Klasse South

Eerste Klasse West-I

Eerste Klasse West-II

Championship play-off

References
RSSSF Netherlands Football League Championships 1898-1954
RSSSF Eerste Klasse Oost
RSSSF Eerste Klasse Noord
RSSSF Eerste Klasse Zuid
RSSSF Eerste Klasse West

Netherlands Football League Championship seasons
Neth
Neth